Lophoturus aequatus is a species of bristly millipede in the family Lophoproctidae.

References

Further reading

 

Polyxenida
Articles created by Qbugbot
Animals described in 1936